Arnold Gartmann (born 18 October 1941) is a Swiss luger. He competed in the men's singles and doubles events at the 1964 Winter Olympics.

References

External links
 
 
 

1941 births
Living people
Swiss male lugers
Olympic lugers of Switzerland
Lugers at the 1964 Winter Olympics
Place of birth missing (living people)